NUA or Nua may refer to:

Colleges
 Nagoya University of Arts, Kitanagoya, Japan
 Nanjing University of the Arts, Nanjing, China
 Norwich University of the Arts, Norwich, UK

Sports
 Nelson United AFC, a New Zealand soccer club
 Ngaruawahia United AFC, an association football club based in Ngāruawāhia, New Zealand
 North Up Alliance, a Dutch football tifosi group associated with AFC Ajax

Places
 Nua (Rajasthan), a town in India
 Nua railway station
 Nua, American Samoa, a village in Lealataua County, American Samoa

Other uses
 National Unity Association, a Greek political party
 Nihon Ukulele Association, a Japanese association for ukulele players
 Yuanga language (ISO 639-3 code)
 Nua, a type of house in the vernacular architecture of Sumatra
 Nua, a 2004 album by Marta Roure
 "Nua", a 2003 song by Ana Carolina from Estampado

See also
 Nanjing University of Aeronautics and Astronautics